The 2002 Oklahoma gubernatorial election was held on November 5, 2002, and was a race for Governor of Oklahoma. Democrat Brad Henry won the election with 43 percent of the vote, beating Republican Steve Largent and conservative independent Gary Richardson.

Henry's narrow win has been attributed to Richardson and Largent's split of the conservative vote and the inclusion of a cockfighting ban on the ballot, an issue which brought cockfighting supporters from Southeastern Oklahoma, a traditional Democratic stronghold that strongly supported Henry, out to vote.

Background
Though Democrats had dominated state politics for most of Oklahoma's history, the Oklahoma Republican Party had made historic gains, including five of the state's six Congressional seats at the time of the election. This made it especially hard for Henry to win with a growing Republican dominance in the state. This was most notable in the urban areas of Oklahoma City and Tulsa, both of which voted for Largent.

Democratic primary
Three state legislators sought the Democratic Party nomination, chasing front-runner Vince Orza who had previously sought the Governor's office as a Republican, only to be defeated by Bill Price in the primary runoff. State Senator Brad Henry limped into the runoff with 28% against Orza's 44%, but opposition to the former Republican from New York coalesced behind Henry. Orza found himself again losing the runoff after winning the initial primary. Henry won the runoff with close to 19 thousand fewer votes than Orza received in the initial primary.

Primary results

Runoff primary results

Republican primary
Steve Largent easily won the GOP nomination against token opposition.

Primary results

General election

Predictions

Polling

Results
This election was extremely close, with Henry prevailing by just 6,866 votes or 0.6%. Under Oklahoma Law, if the margin of victory is less than one percent but greater than half a percent, the losing candidate can request a recount that their campaign has to pay for. However, Largent ultimately decided against it, considering that because Henry led by 6,866 votes, the possibility of him prevailing were extremely difficult. On November 23, Largent officially conceded defeat. Two days later on November 25, Oklahoma Secretary of State Kay Dudley certified the results, declaring Henry the governor-elect.

By congressional district
Henry won 2 of 5 congressional districts.

Notes

References

2002
Gubernatorial
Okla